This is a list of Scottish football transfers, featuring at least one 2020–21 Scottish Premiership club or one 2020–21 Scottish Championship club, which were completed during the summer 2020 transfer window. Due to the effects of the coronavirus pandemic on the football calendar, the summer window for transfers in Scotland ran from 14 July to 5 October. Those dates used the full 12-week period permitted by FIFA, and the governing bodies also authorised clubs outside the Premiership to make loan signings during October 2020.

List

See also
 List of Scottish football transfers winter 2019–20
 List of Scottish football transfers winter 2020–21

References

Transfers
Scottish
2020 in Scottish sport
2020 summer